Arthur James Everett (2 February 1891 – 1983) was a Canadian rowing coxswain. He competed in the men's coxed four event at the 1920 Summer Olympics.

References

External links
 

1891 births
1983 deaths
Canadian male rowers
Olympic rowers of Canada
Rowers at the 1920 Summer Olympics
Rowers from Toronto
Coxswains (rowing)